Hörl is a German surname. Notable people with the surname include:

Josef Georg Hörl (1722–1806), Austrian lawyer and mayor of Vienna
Ottmar Hörl (born 1950), German artist and writer
Thomas Hörl (born 1981), Austrian ski jumper

See also
Arthur Hoerl (1891–1968), American screenwriter

German-language surnames